Style is a 2002 Tamil language drama film, written and directed by Sibi Chakravarthy. It stars Raghava Lawrence and Gayathri Raguram, while Ramana and Vadivelu portray supporting roles. The music for the film was composed by Bharani and the film opened to mixed reviews in December 2002.

Cast

 Raghava Lawrence as Vetrivel
 Ramana as Vetri
 Gayathri Raguram as Viji
 Vadivelu as Manmadhan
 Anandaraj as Marthandam
 Ilavarasu as Pandithurai
 Vaiyapuri as Manikkam
 Chaplin Babu as Nathan
 Nalini as Vetrivel's mother
 Jyothi as Viji's mother
 Kuyili as Selvi's mother
 Junior Silk as House owner's daughter
 Sonia as Anjamma
 Payal as Selvi
 Sri Latha
 Singamuthu as House owner
 Kumarimuthu
 Thalapathy Dinesh
 Scissor Manohar
 Kovai Senthil as Swamy

Production
Raghava Lawrence worked on Style after completing work on Arputham (2002), and appeared in two Tamil films in quick succession. Arul, who had earlier written the script for Aranmanai Kaavalan (1994), was announced as the film's director, while Padmamagan wrote the dialogues for the film.

Soundtrack
Lyrics written by Pa. Vijay and Bharani (Pottu Eduthu).

"Kadhalithal Anandham" — Hariharan
"Kadhalithal Anandham" — K. S. Chithra
"Varuiral En" — Unnikrishnan
"Pottu Eduthu" — Pushpavanam Kuppusamy, Swarnalatha
"Style Style" — Tippu
"Unakku Enna" — Unnikrishnan
"Kadithamillai" — Unnikrishnan
"Muzhu Nila" - Hariharan

Release
The film had a low-key release during December 2002. The director of the film, Sibi Chakravarthy, later attempted to make a film with Dhanush and debutant Mamta Zaveri titled Raghava, but financial troubles stopped the production.

References

2002 films
2000s Tamil-language films